Penny Dahl, better known mononymously as Penny, is an alternative hip hop artist based in San Francisco, California and formerly affiliated with the Plague Language collective. She released her debut album, The Clockforth Movement, on Plague Language on October 29, 2002. On January 4, 2013, Fake Four Inc. released Twenties Hungry: The Unbound Anthems of Yesteryear, an EP collecting various Penny recordings from 2003 through 2006.

Discography
Albums
 The Clockforth Movement (2002, Plague Language)

EPs
 Twenties Hungry: The Unbound Anthems of Yesteryear (2013, Fake Four Inc.)

Compilations
 Miscellanea (2005, Beyond Space Entertainment)

Guest appearances
 Ceschi – "Not Sure" from Fake Flowers (2004)
 Bleubird & Scott da Ros – "Fuck You, We Don't Need You (Mega Posse Cut)" (2008)

Featured tracks
 "Our Addict Rings" appears on Panic Room (2003, Animal Factory)
 "Dreams" appears on Farewell Archetypes Vol. 2 (2004, Subversiv Rec/Plague Language)
 "Early Humans May Have Used Makeup, Seafood" appears on 52 Weeks (2008, Peppermill Records)

See also
 Plague Language
 Fake Four Inc.

References

External links
 Penny on Discogs

American women rappers
Living people
Rappers from the San Francisco Bay Area
Underground rappers
21st-century American rappers
21st-century American women musicians
Year of birth missing (living people)
21st-century women rappers